Phengaris atroguttata, the great spotted blue, is a small butterfly found in India, Myanmar, and China that belongs to the lycaenids or blues family.

Taxonomy
The butterfly was earlier known as Polyommatus atroguttata (Oberthür).

Range
It is found in Nagaland and the Chin Hills of Myanmar and is considered rare.

Subspecies
Phengaris atroguttata atroguttata northwest India, west China and Taiwan
Phengaris atroguttata juenana (Forster, 1940) Yunnan
Phengaris atroguttata lampra (Röber, 1926) north Myanmar
Phengaris daitozana Wileman, 1911

Description
The butterfly ranges from 44 to 48 mm. The butterfly is white with pale blue suffusion, and, also a dark border on the forewing. The male butterfly has very large black discal spots showing through from below. These are darkened in above in the case of the female butterfly.

See also
List of butterflies of India (Lycaenidae)

Cited references

References
 
 
 
 

atroguttata
Butterflies of Asia